Shea Gordon may refer to:
 Shea Gordon (artist)
 Shea Gordon (footballer)